Pallavii Subhash Shirke (born 9 June 1984) is an Indian actress. A model turned actress, she began her career in Marathi plays, films and TV shows and later appeared in Hindi TV shows. She has worked in various Telugu, Kannada, Marathi, Sinhala films. She is known for her roles as Dharma in the television show Chakravartin Ashoka Samrat (2015-2016), and as Yasodhara - the wife of Prince Siddhartha - in the film Bimba Devi Alias Yashodhara (2018).

Career

Television 
After completing her B.Com., Pallavii Shirke wanted to pursue law and become an advocate like her grandfather but she got an offer from the director Kedar Shinde to play a role in the Marathi play Tu Tu Mee Mee and from here her career in the television industry started. She worked in various Marathi plays, films, ads and TV shows. She appeared in the Marathi serials Char Divas Sasuche on ETV Marathi and Adhuri Ek Kahani on Zee Marathi. Subhash debuted with the Hindi serial Tumhari Disha. She was noticed by Ekta Kapoor in that serial and in 2006 got selected for the next Hindi serial, Karam Apnaa Apnaa produced by Balaji Telefilms. In this she played the central role of Gauri, a middle class Bengali girl, for her performance she was nominated for the Indian Telly Award for Fresh New Face in 2007.

From 2007 to 2008 she played a negative role of Meera in Balaji Telefilms's Kasamh Se. For her role in this show she was nominated for the Indian Telly Award for Best Actress in a Negative Role in 2008.

From 2008 to 2009 Pallavii Shirke played a role of Sneha Ahuja in television series Aathvaan Vachan aired on Sony Entertainment Television. She has also worked in the serial Basera aired on Imagine TV in which she was seen as Ketaki Sanghvi. in 2009.

She later acted in Godh Bharaai in which she has a chance to play her age, but it did badly and was pulled off air.

In 2011 she played a role of a character of her age opposite Sandeep Kulkarni in Zee Marathi's daily soap Guntata Hriday He by Satish Rajwade.

In 2013 she played the role of Rukmini in the mythological series Mahabharat by Siddharth Kumar Tewary. She was earlier supposed to play the role of Princess Amba in the series, but had to opt out of it because her prior commitments clashed with the shoot of the show. 

From 2015 to 2016 she played the role of Subhadrangi in the historical series Chakravartin Ashoka Samrat. Her role was of Ashoka's mother and Bindusara's second wife.

In 2018 she play a role of Aruna in Indian Hindi horror anthology television series Kaun hai? in the story tittle 'Mother'.

Films 
In 2003 Pallavii Shirke starred alongside Vijay Patkar in the Marathi movie Polisachi Bayko directed by Mansingh Pawar. Its a comedy drama film in which a submissive policeman who likes to keep his boss happy is stunned when his wife lands a better-paying job, written by Omkar.

She made her film debut in 2005 in the Marathi film Kunku Zale Vairi directed by Nagesh Darak and she was nominated for the 'Best Actress Zee Gaurav Award' for her performance in the film. She also played a role in Mandar Shinde's comedy Marathi film No Problem in the same year where Navin Prabhakar, Jeetendra Joshi and Savita Malpekar were in the lead role. 

Subhash played a lead role in Manoj Palrecha's 2006 Marathi film Sage Soyare alongside Sonali Kulkarni, Pankaj Vishnu and Vilas Ujawane. In the same year she also starred alongside Ankush Chaudhary, Jitendra Joshi, Sushant Shellar, Yatin Karyekar, Shakuntala Nare and Amit Phalke in the Marathi film Aaila Re!! directed by Deepak Naidu.

In 2008 classic Marathi movie Mee Sansar Mandite directed by Vishwanath Chauhan released. In this film Subhash starred alongside Alka Kubal-Aathalye, Ashok Shinde, Ravindra Berde and Suhasini Deshpande.

After seven years she made a comeback to films with three Marathi projects, Atul Kale's Asa Mee Ashi Tee opposite Sachit Patil, Tejas Deoskar's Premasutra opposite Sandeep Kulkarni and Gashmeer Mahajan's Dhava Dhava Khun Khun. Asa Mee Ashi Tee and Premasutra were romantic films. In the former she played an urban career oriented Punjabi girl for which she had to speak Marathi with a Punjabi accent and a Goan Catholic girl named Saniya in the latter. She had shot for two films in the past with actor Sachit Patil but both the films didn't make it to the theaters. She also acted in a Tamil film Om with Arjun Sarja. and then in a Kannada film Rascal but both could not be released.

In 2014 Subhash appeared in Sachin Kundalkar’s film Happy Journey. In this film Atul Kulkarni and Priya Bapat were in the lead roles and the film grossed nearly ₹4Crore (US$560,000) at the box office.

She was signed as the female lead for Gautham Vasudev Menon's next Tamil film Achcham Yenbadhu Madamaiyada opposite Silambarasan, but couldn't continue allot bulk dates to the film and was replaced by Manjima Mohan.

In 2015 she acted in Puneeth Rajkumar’s 25th film Chakravyuha (2016 film) directed by M. Saravanan. It is an Indian Kannada language film. When Saravanan saw the rushes on the editing table, he wasn't impressed. He wanted a character who knew the language better. Saravanam replaced Subhash with Kannada girl Rachita Ram. Subhash shot for a couple of days for this film.

Subhash made her debut in the Telugu film industry in 2016, she starred alongside Sumanth and Tanikella Bharani in Mallik Ram's romantic comedy film Naruda Donoruda. This film is a Telugu remake of 2012 Hindi film Vicky Donor.

In 2018 Subhash made her debut in Sinhala language and she played her first title role opposite Indian actor Arpit Choudhary in Prof. Sunil Ariyaratne’s film Bimba Devi Alias Yashodhara. The film is a Sri Lankan Sinhala language, epic, biographical drama written and directed by Prof. Ariyaratne. This historical biographical film depicts the life of Princess Yaśodharā, the wife of Prince Siddhartha. Subhash was honoured with a Distinguished Achievement Award on 12 October 2018 at the Annual Gala Dinner and Awards nights of SAFAL 2018 in Sydney, Australia, for her contribution to the film. She is the only Marathi actress who has worked in not only all south Indian languages but also in Sinhala language. This film won the award for the Highest Grossing Film of the Year 2018 in Sri Lanka at the Seventh Derana Lux Film Awards 2019.

Thereafter she performed a significant role in Rajesh Chavan’s 2018 Marathi film Ghar Hota Menacha. Where Siddharth Jadhav, Alka Kubal, Mohan Joshi and Avinash Narkar featured as lead characters.

In 2019 Subhash starred alongside Milind Gunaji and Sainkeet Kamat in the Marathi film Miranda House directed by Rajendra Talak.

Modelling 
Subhash is a model for TV advertisements for products like Lion Date Jam, Everest Gharam Masala, Lifebouy, 3 roses and others. She became a very popular model for TV advertisements in 2012 and 2013. She received praise for her work in the "Meethe mein kuch meetha ho jaaye" ad campaign for Cadbury's after which she was referred to as the 'Cadbury girl'. In 2019 she has done ad campaigns for VGN Victoria Park, The Chennai Shopping Mall and Sri Mahalakshmi Silks.

Filmography

Television

Films

Television advertisements 
2011:Appeared in Vasan Dental Care advertisement

Awards and nominations

References

External links 

 
 

Indian film actresses
Living people
1974 births
Actresses from Mumbai
Actresses in Kannada cinema
Actresses in Telugu cinema
Actresses in Marathi cinema
Indian television actresses
Indian soap opera actresses
Actresses in Hindi television
Marathi people
Indian women television presenters
Indian television presenters
21st-century Indian actresses